The Dadra and Nagar Haveli and Daman and Diu Police is the law enforcement agency for the union territory of Dadra and Nagar Haveli and Daman and Diu in India.

History
Dadra and Nagar Haveli and Daman and Diu Police was created on 26 January 2020 at the same time as the union territories of Dadra and Nagar Haveli and Daman and Diu were merged to create the new union territory of Dadra and Nagar Haveli and Daman and Diu Police.
The new force replaces the earlier Dadra and Nagar Haveli Police and Daman and Diu Police forces.

Organizational structure
Dadra and Nagar Haveli and Daman and Diu Police comes under direct control of Department of Home Affairs, Government of India.
The Dadra and Nagar Haveli and Daman and Diu Police is headed by Deputy Inspector General of Police (DIG).

References

External links
Dadra and Nagar Haveli and Daman and Diu Police
Dadra and Nagar Haveli and Daman and Diu Police on Facebook

Government of Dadra and Nagar Haveli and Daman and Diu
State law enforcement agencies of India
Government agencies established in 2020
2020 establishments in Dadra and Nagar Haveli and Daman and Diu